The A823 is a road in Scotland which goes from south of Crieff to Dunfermline. It joins onto the A823(M) and the A822 which runs to Crieff.

Roads in Scotland